The 29th Pennsylvania Volunteer Infantry was an infantry regiment that served in the Union Army during the American Civil War.

Service
The 29th Pennsylvania Infantry was organized in Philadelphia, Pennsylvania, beginning May 15, 1861, for a three-year enlistment and mustered in July 1, 1861, under the command of Colonel John K. Murphy.

The regiment was attached to Gordon's Brigade, Department of the Susquehanna, August 1861. 3rd Brigade. Banks' Division, Army of the Potomac, to March 1862. 3rd Brigade, 1st Division, Banks' V Corps, and Department of the Shenandoah to June 1862. 3rd Brigade, 1st Division, II Corps, Army of Virginia, to September 1862. 3rd Brigade, 1st Division, XII Corps, Army of the Potomac, to March 1863. 2nd Brigade, 2nd Division, XII Corps, Army of the Potomac, to October 1863, and Army of the Cumberland to April 1864. 3rd Brigade, 2nd Division, XX Corps, Army of the Cumberland, to June 1865. Bartlett's Division, XXII Corps, Department of Washington, to July 1865.

The 29th Pennsylvania Infantry mustered out July 11, 1865.

Detailed service

1861
 Left Pennsylvania for Harpers Ferry, Va., August 3
 Duty at Harpers Ferry and on the Upper Potomac River until February 1862
 Operations about Dams 4 and 5 December 17–20, 1861
1862
 Advance on Winchester March 1–12
 Occupation of Winchester March 12
 Pursuit of Jackson up the Shenandoah Valley March 24 – April 27
 Woodstock April 1
 Edenburg April 1–2
 Stony Creek April 2
 Operations in Shenandoah Valley May 15 – June 17
 Front Royal May 23 (Companies B and G)
 Buckton Station May 23
 Middletown and Newtown May 24
 Retreat to Williamsport May 24–26
 Battle of Winchester May 25
 At Williamsport until June 10
 Moved to Front Royal June 10–18; then to Warrenton and Little Washington July 11–18
 Pope's campaign in northern Virginia August 6 – September 2
 Battle of Cedar Mountain August 9 (reserve)
 Guarding supply trains during the Second Battle of Bull Run
 Maryland Campaign September 6–24
 Battle of Antietam September 16–17 (provost and rear guard)
 Chambersburg, Pa., October 11
 Duty at Maryland Heights until December
 March to Fredericksburg, Va., December 10–16
 Fairfax Station December 12
 At Stafford Court House until April 1863
1863
 "Mud March" January 20–24
 Chancellorsville Campaign April 27 – May 6
 Battle of Chancellorsville May 1–5
 Gettysburg Campaign June 11 – July 24
 Battle of Gettysburg July 1–3
 Pursuit of Lee July 5–24
 Duty on line of the Rappahannock River until September
 Movement to Bridgeport, Ala., September 24 – October 3
 Reopening Tennessee River October 26–29
 Battle of Wauhatchie October 28–29
 Chattanooga-Ringgold Campaign November 23–27
 Battle of Lookout Mountain November 23–24
 Missionary Ridge November 25
 Ringgold Gap, Taylor's Ridge, November 27
 Reenlisted December 10
 Guard duty on Nashville & Chattanooga Railroad until April 1864
1864
 Atlanta Campaign May 1 – September 8
 Demonstration on Rocky Faced Ridge and Dalton May 8–13
 Battle of Resaca May 14–15
 Near Cassville May 19
 New Hope Church May 25
 Operations on line of Pumpkin Vine Creek and battles about Dallas, New Hope Church, and Allatoona Hills May 26 – June 5
 Operations about Marietta and against Kennesaw Mountain June 10 – July 2
 Pine Hill June 11–14
 Lost Mountain June 15–17
 Gilgal or Golgotha Church June 15
 Muddy Creek June 17
 Noyes Creek June 19
 Kolb's Farm June 22
 Assault on Kennesaw Mountain June 27
 Ruff's Station or Smyrna Camp Ground July 4
 Chattahoochie River July 5–17
 Peachtree Creek July 19–20
 Siege of Atlanta July 22 – August 25
 Operations at Chattahoochie River Bridge August 26 – September 2
 Occupation of Atlanta September 2 – November 15
 Expedition to Tuckum's Cross Roads October 26–29
 Near Atlanta November 9
 March to the sea November 15 – December 10
 Near Davidsboro November 28
 Siege of Savannah December 10–21
1865
 Carolinas Campaign January to April
 Battle of Bentonville, N.C., March 19–21
 Occupation of Goldsboro March 24
 Advance on Raleigh April 9–13
 Occupation of Raleigh April 14
 Bennett's House April 26
 Surrender of Johnston and his army
 March to Washington, D.C., via Richmond, Va., April 29 – May 20
 Grand Review of the Armies May 24
Duty in Department of Washington, D.C., until July.

Casualties
The regiment lost a total of 187 men during service; 3 officers and 99 enlisted men killed or mortally wounded, 1 officer and 84 enlisted men died of disease.

Commanders
 Colonel John K. Murphy – discharged April 23, 1863, due to disability
 Colonel William Rickards, Jr. – discharged November 2, 1864, due to wounds received in action at the Battle of Kennesaw Mountain
 Colonel Samuel M. Zulick

See also

 List of Pennsylvania Civil War Units
 Pennsylvania in the Civil War

References
 Dechert, Robert Porter. Oration of Colonel Robert Porter Dechert at Dedication of Monument of 29th Regiment Pennsylvania Volunteers, Gettysburg, July 3, 1885 (S.l.: s.n.), 1885.
 Dyer, Frederick H. A Compendium of the War of the Rebellion (Des Moines, IA: Dyer Pub. Co.), 1908.
Attribution

External links
 National and regimental flags of the 29th Pennsylvania Volunteer Infantry and 29th Pennsylvania Veteran Volunteer Infantry
 29th Pennsylvania Infantry monuments at Gettysburg Battlefield

Military units and formations established in 1861
Military units and formations disestablished in 1865
Units and formations of the Union Army from Pennsylvania